Wesley Wait (May 15, 1861 – July 16, 1949) was an American inventor, author, dental surgeon, and florist. Wait graduated from the New York College of Dentistry in 1884 and in 1885 married Emily Smith Rawlins, daughter of the Civil War general John Aaron Rawlins. Many of Wait's inventions have been patented and published in the Official Gazette of the United States Patent Office. Wait's patents included aerial vessels, bridges, greenhouses, frame supports, wire fasteners, and interlocking joints. In 1901 Wait wrote a book titled "The Unity of the Universal Existence" and worked with the Smithsonian Institution between 1921 and 1925 to further his research in this area.

References

External links
 Patent history for inventor Wesley Wait of Newburgh, NY
 Short biography of Dr. Wesley Wait DDS of Newburgh, NY (1861–1949)

1861 births
1949 deaths
Smithsonian Institution people
American inventors
American dentists
People from Montgomery, New York
People from Newburgh, New York
New York University College of Dentistry alumni